Julien Outrebon (born 16 June 1983 in Épernay) is a retired French professional footballer. He is currently the assistant manager of FC Lorient.

Career
Outrebon has played professionally in Ligue 2 for Amiens SC and ES Troyes.

After retiring at the end of the 2016/17 season, Outrebon became manager of Paris FC's reserve team in the Championnat National 3 and also as assistant manager for the first team. He later also coached the U17's.

In June 2019, he was appointed second assistant manager of Christophe Pelissier at FC Lorient.

Personal life
Outrebon is married to Bérengère Troch, the daughter of Denis Troch and the brother-in-law of Gautier Troch. The couple has a son called Tiago and a daughter called Lola.

Notes

1983 births
Living people
French footballers
Championnat National players
Ligue 2 players
Amiens SC players
AS Cherbourg Football players
Entente SSG players
US Créteil-Lusitanos players
ES Troyes AC players
Luzenac AP players
People from Épernay
Association football defenders
Sportspeople from Marne (department)
Footballers from Grand Est